Poshteh-ye Kol Kol (also known as Peleh-ye Kolkol and Pelleh Kalkal) is a village in Asemanabad Rural District, in the Central District of Chardavol County, Ilam Province, Iran. At the 2006 census, its population was 111, in 19 families. The village is populated by Kurds.

References 

Populated places in Chardavol County
Kurdish settlements in Ilam Province